Clitocybe brumalis, commonly known as the winter funnel cap, brumalis signifying "wintry", is an inedible mushroom of the genus Clitocybe. It grows in deciduous and coniferous woodland, only in winter; sometimes even under snow.

Description
The cap is convex or umbilicate when young, soon funnel-shaped. Pale when moist, with a weakly translucent and striped margin, almost white when dry, it grows up to 5 cm in diameter. The gills are dirty white, crowded and a little decurrent. The spores are also white. The stem is pale brown, striped and soon hollow, with a white, felty base. The flesh is dirty brown.

Similar species
Several species growing in autumn look very similar and are difficult to distinguish without a microscope.

References

E. Garnweidner. Mushrooms and Toadstools of Britain and Europe. Collins. 1994.

External links
 
 

brumalis
Fungi described in 1872
Fungi of Europe
Taxa named by Elias Magnus Fries